Darko Fejsa (Serbian Cyrillic: Дарко Фејса; born 27 August 1987) is a Serbian professional footballer who plays as a left-back. He is the older brother of Serbia international Ljubomir Fejsa.

Career
Fejsa started out at his hometown club Vrbas, making his senior debut at the age of 16. He later moved to top-flight side Hajduk Kula and made over 100 league appearances. On the last day of the 2012 summer transfer window, Fejsa signed with fellow Serbian SuperLiga club Radnički Kragujevac.

References

External links
 

Association football defenders
FK Hajduk Kula players
FK Radnički 1923 players
FK Vrbas players
People from Vrbas, Serbia
Serbian footballers
Serbian SuperLiga players
1987 births
Living people